Gillian Elise Avery (30 September 1926 – 31 January 2016) was a British children's novelist, and a historian of childhood education and children's literature. 
She won the Guardian Children's Fiction Prize in 1972, for A Likely Lad. It was adapted for television in 1990.

Life
Gillian Avery was born in Reigate, Surrey, and attended Dunottar School there. She worked first as a journalist on the Surrey Mirror, then for Chambers's Encyclopaedia and Oxford University Press.  In 1952 she married the literary scholar A. O. J. Cockshut, with whom she moved to Manchester, returning to Oxford in 1964.

She is the author of several studies of the history of education and of children's literature, and that scholarly interest is reflected in her own books for children, which are set in Victorian England.  The first, The Warden's Niece (1957), is a witty adventure story in which Maria runs away from her stultifying boarding school to live with her great-uncle, the head of an Oxford college.  Impressed by her academic ambitions (she wants to become Professor of Greek), he decides to let her stay, and she proves her abilities as a researcher by uncovering a piece of history from the English Civil War.

Characters from The Warden's Niece reappear in The Elephant War (1960), which is about an attempt to prevent the sale of Jumbo by the London Zoo to P. T. Barnum, and in The Italian Spring (1962).

Beside winning the Guardian Prize for A Likely Lad, Gillian Avery was three times a commended runner-up for the Carnegie Medal from the Library Association, which recognises the year's best children's book by a British writer: for The Warden's Niece (1957), The Greatest Gresham (1962) and A Likely Lad (1971).

Avery died in January 2016 at the age of 89.

Selected works

Children's books
 The Warden's Niece (1957, U.S. 1963) ‡
 Trespassers at Charlcote (1958)
 James Without Thomas (1959)
 The Elephant War (1960, U.S. 1971), illustrated by John Verney ‡
 To Tame a Sister (1961), illustrated by John Verney
 The Greatest Gresham (1962)
 The Peacock House (1963)
 The Italian Spring (1964, U.S. 1972), illustrated by John Verney ‡
 Call of the Valley (1968)
 A Likely Lad (Collins, 1971), illustrated by Faith Jaques
 Ellen's Birthday (1971)
 Ellen and the Queen (1972), illustrated by Krystyna Turska
 Huck and her Time Machine (1977)
 Mouldy's Orphan (1978), illustrated by Faith Jaques

‡ The Warden's Niece and its sequels The Elephant War and The Italian Spring were published in the U.S. several years after their first editions. The first and third were reissued many years later as Maria Escapes (1992) and Maria's Italian Spring (1993). 
 Naomi Lewis reviewed The Elephant War as "the fourth of this author's witty and exhilarating stories about children and their elders living in Victorian Oxfordshire. The dialogue alone would make them a pleasure to read—though, since most of the fathers are wardens or dons, the reader does need to be a fairly literate child." The Observer, 11 December 1960, p. 28.

Non-fiction
Mrs Ewing (London: Bodley Head, 1961) —about Juliana Horatia Ewing
Childhood's Pattern: A Study of the Heroes and Heroines of Children's Fiction, 1770–1950 (London: Hodder & Stoughton, 1975)
The Best Type of Girl: A History of Girls' Independent Schools (London, 1991)
 Behold the Child: American Children and Their Books, 1621–1922 (Baltimore: Johns Hopkins University Press, 1994)
Cheltenham Ladies: An Illustrated History of the Cheltenham Ladies' College (London: James & James Ltd, 2003)
As editor
 The Journal of Emily Pepys (London: Prospect, 1984)

Notes

References

Citations
 Cadogan, Mary, 'Avery, Gillian (Elise)', Twentieth Century Children's Writers, ed. D.L. Kirkpatrick (London: Macmillan, 1978), 57–9.
 Carpenter, Humphrey and Prichard, Mari, The Oxford Companion to Children’s Literature (Oxford:OUP) 1984, 38–9.
 Townsend, John Rowe, Written for Children (Harmondsworth: Penguin) ed. 3 1987, 255–6

External links

 Gillian Avery search results at Kirkus Reviews
  (previous page of browse report, as 'Avery, Gillian 1926–' without '2016')

1926 births
2016 deaths
Children's literature criticism
English children's writers
Guardian Children's Fiction Prize winners
People educated at Dunottar School for Girls
People from Reigate
20th-century British women writers